The Story So Far is a compilation album by British pop group Bucks Fizz, released in 1988. The album collects together 18 of the group's biggest hit singles spanning the years 1981 to 1988, including their three number ones.

Background 

The album was released in November 1988 on the Stylus record label, which had licensed the tracks from Bucks Fizz's record companies, RCA and Polydor. At the time, the group had just released the single "Heart of Stone", which became their 20th and final hit and was the only new song featured on this collection. Other tracks on the album are the bulk of the group's hit singles along with two album tracks. One notable omission however was "When We Were Young", one of the group's biggest hits. This was most likely because lead singer of the track, Jay Aston was no longer with the band. Another single, "You Love Love" from this album was released in 1989, but this was originally from their 1983 album, Hand Cut.

Critical reception
The album was reviewed in Number One magazine, where it gained a favourable response, saying that Bucks Fizz made unashamedly good music and listing tracks "The Land of Make Believe", "If You Can't Stand the Heat" and "Making Your Mind Up" as favourites. The same magazine had also claimed current single "Heart of Stone" to be a contender for the Christmas number one, although this proved to be way out in terms of time (October) and actual peak position (No.50).

Commercial performance
The album failed to chart despite TV advertising and was the last album Bucks Fizz released featuring this line-up.

Track listing

Side one
"Heart of Stone" (Andy Hill / Pete Sinfield) Previously unreleased
"Talking in Your Sleep" (Palmer / Skill / Canler / Solley / Marinos) from I Hear Talk
"20th Century Hero (Live)" (Hill / Sinfield) from "Talking in Your Sleep" EP
"One of Those Nights" (Steve Glen / Mike Burns / Dave Most) from Bucks Fizz
"Now Those Days Are Gone" (Hill / Nichola Martin) from Are You Ready
"Magical" (John Parr / Meat Loaf) from Writing on the Wall
"Piece of the Action" (Hill) from Bucks Fizz
"The Land of Make Believe" (Hill / Sinfield) from Are You Ready
"I Hear Talk" (Hill / Sinfield) from I Hear Talk

Side two
"New Beginning (Mamba Seyra)" (Mike Myers / Tony Gibber) from Writing on the Wall
"If You Can't Stand the Heat" (Hill / Ian Bairnson) from Hand Cut
"My Camera Never Lies" (Hill / Martin) from Are You Ready
"You Love Love" (Andy Sells) from Hand Cut
"Run for Your Life" (Hill / Bairnson) from Hand Cut
"You and Your Heart so Blue" (Hill / Sinfield) from Writing on the Wall
"London Town" (Hill) from Greatest Hits
"Making Your Mind Up" (Hill / John Danter) from Bucks Fizz
"Keep Each Other Warm" (Hill / Sinfield) from Writing on the Wall

Personnel 

Bobby G – vocals
Cheryl Baker – vocals
Mike Nolan – vocals
Jay Aston – vocals on all tracks except "New Beginning (Mamba Seyra)", "Keep Each Other Warm" and "Heart of Stone"
Shelley Preston – vocals on "New Beginning (Mamba Seyra)", "Keep Each Other Warm" and "Heart of Stone"
Andy Hill – producer
Mike Myers – co-producer on "New Beginning (Mamba Seyra)"

References 

Bucks Fizz compilation albums
1988 compilation albums